Steel Magnolia EP is a 5-song extended play released on February 23, 2010, by country music duo Steel Magnolia. The EP features the duo's debut single, "Keep On Lovin' You", which reached the top 20 on the U.S. Billboard Hot Country Songs chart. It also features the song "Ooh La La" which they performed on Can You Duet. Also included are two additional live cover songs, "I Need You" (originally performed by Tim McGraw and Faith Hill), and "Fast as You", originally sung by Dwight Yoakam.

Critical reception 
Jessica Phillips of Country Weekly rated the EP three stars out of five, saying it "offers a taste of what fans[…]loved about these winners" and "will leave fans longing for a full album."

Track listing

Chart performance

References

2010 debut EPs
Steel Magnolia EPs
Albums produced by Dann Huff
Big Machine Records EPs